Sulaiman Abdulghafour is a goalkeeper in Al Arabi SC and Kuwait national football team
holding number 22 and 23 in the national team. He was recently called up for the 2014 Gulf Cup and played in AFC Asian Cup against Oman in last group stage match.

References

External links 
 

1991 births
Living people
Kuwaiti footballers
Al-Arabi SC (Kuwait) players
Sportspeople from Kuwait City
Kuwait international footballers
Association football goalkeepers
Kuwait Premier League players